Nina Mikhaylovna Doroshina  (3 December 1934 — 21 April 2018) was a Soviet and Russian actress of theater and cinema, People's Artist of the RSFSR (1985).

Personal life 
She was married twice. Her first husband was the actor Oleg Dahl. They married in 1963, but the marriage soon disintegrated. Her second marriage was to Vladimir Tyshkov, a lighting designer in the Sovremennik Theatre; they lived together for about 20 years, until Tyshkov's death in 2004. Doroshina died in Moscow on 21 April 2018.

Filmography

Awards
 Honored Artist of the RSFSR (1970)
 People’s Artist of the RSFSR (1985)
 Order of Honour (2006)
 Order of Friendship (2010)

References

External links
 
 Нина Дорошина на сайте театра «Современник»

1934 births
2018 deaths
Russian film actresses
Soviet film actresses
Russian stage actresses
Soviet stage actresses
Recipients of the Order of Honour (Russia)
People's Artists of the RSFSR
Honored Artists of the RSFSR
20th-century Russian actresses
21st-century Russian actresses
People from Moscow Oblast